Beas de Segura is a town located in the province of Jaén, Spain. According to the 2009 census (INE), the town has a population of 5,591 inhabitants.

Beas de Segura is a municipality and Spanish town located in the province of Jaén in the autonomous community of Andalusia. It is included in the region of Sierra de Segura, with almost a quarter of its territory within the Natural Park of the Sierras de Cazorla, Segura and Las Villas6 and has an extension of 160.3 km², being a transition between the countryside and la sierra.7 In 2016, its municipal register registered a population of 5,380 inhabitants, 8 making it the most populated municipality in the region, as well as the center of influence of the bordering municipalities.

The majority of its lands consist of agricultural areas dedicated mainly to the cultivation of olive trees, which is why it is integrated into the "Spanish Association of Municipalities of the Olive Tree of the province of Jaén" (AEMO) .9 Its excellent oil production oliva has allowed its oil industry to be included in the denomination of origin of the homonymous mountain.10 This activity, together with livestock, tourism and numerous areas of natural, cultural and rural interest, constitute its main economic activity.

The first vestiges of civilization date from the Lower Paleolithic, where on the banks of the Guadalimar River lived human beings in small hordes and subsisted on the natural resources offered by the land. No human skeletal remains have been found, but a rich lithic industry has been found, some of whose tools are on display at the Museum of Natural Sciences in Madrid and the Jaén Museum, listed as one of the oldest in Andalusia.11

From the Roman stage there is evidence of the Mocho Bridge over the Guadalimar River, which is almost 2000 years old; it is said that Santa Teresa de Jesús left after founding the Convent of Carmelitas de Beas, the first foundation in what is now Andalusia, when he left for Seville. The convent of Beas was declared as an Asset of Cultural Interest on April 25, 1979, and years later, on March 22, 1983, opened in the General Catalog of the Andalusian Historical Heritage.12

From the 22 to the 25 of April the celebrations in honor to San Marcos are celebrated for centuries, being protagonist of the same the well-known one as bull ensogao. This festivity has an important repercussion both nationally and internationally and was declared as National Tourist Interest Festivals of Andalusia on September 16, 2008.13

References

Municipalities in the Province of Jaén (Spain)